Indonesia participated in the 1958 Asian Games held in the city of Tokyo, Japan from May 24, 1958 to June 1, 1958.

Medal summary

Medal table

Medalists

References

Nations at the 1958 Asian Games
1958
Asian Games